The French War Memorial on Goubert Avenue in South India is a monument to Indian soldiers who served with the Allied Forces in the First World War.

History
The memorial was built in 1971. Every year on 14 July (Bastille Day) the memorial is illuminated and a ceremony is held to honour the dead.